Amicus is an unincorporated community in Greene County, Virginia, United States.  Amīcus is the Latin word for 'friend'.

References
GNIS reference

Unincorporated communities in Greene County, Virginia
Unincorporated communities in Virginia